Ernest Frederick, Duke of Saxe-Coburg-Saalfeld (8 March 1724, in Saalfeld – 8 September 1800, in Coburg), was a Duke of Saxe-Coburg-Saalfeld.

Biography
He was the eldest son of Francis Josias, Duke of Saxe-Coburg-Saalfeld and Anna Sophie of Schwarzburg-Rudolstadt.

Ernest Frederick succeeded his father in the Duchy of Saxe-Coburg-Saalfeld when he died in 1764 and established his definitive residence shifted in Coburg. Because of the high indebtedness of the duchy he was compelled by Emperor Joseph II in 1773 to work with a Debit commission—an obligatory administration of debts assigned by the emperor—for over thirty years.

Issue
In Wolfenbüttel on 23 April 1749 Ernest Frederick married with Sophia Antonia of Brunswick-Wolfenbüttel. They had seven children:
 Franz Frederick Anton, Duke of Saxe-Coburg-Saalfeld (b. Coburg 15 July 1750 – d. Coburg, 9 December 1806), father of Leopold I of Belgium and grandfather of Leopold II, Empress Carlota of Mexico, Queen Victoria of Great Britain, and her husband Prince Albert.
 Karl Wilhelm Ferdinand (b. Coburg, 21 November 1751 – d. Coburg, 16 February 1757).
 Fredericka Juliane (b. Coburg, 14 September 1752 – d. Coburg, 24 September 1752).
 Caroline Ulrike Amalie (b. Coburg, 19 October 1753 – d. Coburg, 1 October 1829), a nun at Gandersheim.
 Ludwig Karl Frederick (b. Coburg, 2 January 1755 – d. Coburg, 4 May 1806); he had an illegitimate son by some Mademoiselle Brutel de la Rivière: Ludwig Frederick Emil von Coburg (b. Hildburghausen, 1779 - d. Coburg, 1827). In turn, the five children of Ludwig Frederick were created Freiherren von Coburg. His descendants are still alive.
 Ferdinand August Heinrich (b. Coburg, 12 April 1756 – d. Coburg, 8 July 1758).
 Frederick (b. Coburg, 4 March 1758 – d. Coburg, 26 June 1758).

Ancestry

References 

 August Beck: Ernst Friedrich, Herzog zu Sachsen-Koburg-Saalfeld. In: Allgemeine Deutsche Biographie (ADB). Band 6, Duncker & Humblot, Leipzig 1877, S. 317.
 Das herzogliche Haus Sachsen-Coburg-Gotha: Seine Geschichte und gegenwärtige Stellung in Europa, C. Macklot, 1842, S. 236 (Digitalisat)

Dukes of Saxe-Coburg-Saalfeld
1724 births
1800 deaths
Recipients of the Order of the White Eagle (Poland)